The 2011 ATP World Tour was the elite men's professional tennis circuit organized by the Association of Tennis Professionals (ATP) for the 2011 season. It was the 42nd edition of the tour and the calendar comprised the Grand Slam tournaments, supervised by the International Tennis Federation (ITF), the ATP World Tour Masters 1000, the ATP World Tour 500 series, the ATP World Tour 250 series, the ATP World Team Championship, the Davis Cup (organized by the ITF), and the ATP World Tour Finals. Also included in the 2011 calendar is the Hopman Cup, which does not distribute ranking points, and is organized by the ITF.

In singles, Novak Djokovic dominated the season. He won ten tournaments, including three Grand Slam (Australian Open, Wimbledon Championships and the US Open), and five Masters Series 1000 titles (Indian Wells, Miami, Madrid, Rome and Canada). He ended the year with a 6–0 record against Rafael Nadal and a 4–1 record against Roger Federer.

Schedule
This is the complete schedule of events on the 2011 calendar, with player progression documented from the quarterfinals stage.

Key

January

February

March

April

May

June

July

August

September

October

November

Statistical information

These tables present the number of singles (S), doubles (D), and mixed doubles (X) titles won by each player and each nation during the season, within all the tournament categories of the 2011 ATP World Tour: the Grand Slam tournaments, the ATP World Tour Finals, the ATP World Tour Masters 1000, the ATP World Tour 500 series, and the ATP World Tour 250 series. The players/nations are sorted by: 1) total number of titles (a doubles title won by two players representing the same nation counts as only one win for the nation); 2) cumulated importance of those titles (one Grand Slam win equalling two Masters 1000 wins, one ATP World Tour Finals win equalling one-and-a-half Masters 1000 win, one Masters 1000 win equalling two 500 events wins, one 500 event win equalling two 250 events wins); 3) a singles > doubles > mixed doubles hierarchy; 4) alphabetical order (by family names for players).

To avoid confusion and double counting, these tables should be updated only after an event is completed. The tables are through to the tournaments completed in the week of 31 October.

Key

Titles won by player

Titles won by nation

Titles information

The following players won their first main circuit title in singles, doubles, or mixed doubles:
Singles
 Kevin Anderson – Johannesburg (singles)
 Ivan Dodig – Zagreb (singles)
 Milos Raonic – San Jose (singles)
 Robin Haase – Kitzbühel (singles)
 Alexandr Dolgopolov – Umag (singles)
 Pablo Andújar – Casablanca (singles)
 Ryan Sweeting – Houston (singles)
 Andreas Seppi – Eastbourne (singles)
 Florian Mayer – Bucharest (singles)
 Janko Tipsarević – Kuala Lumpur (singles)

Doubles
 Adil Shamasdin – Johannesburg (doubles)
 Robin Haase – Marseille (doubles)
 Leonardo Mayer – Buenos Aires (doubles)
 Alexandr Dolgopolov – Indian Wells (doubles)
 Simone Bolelli – Munich (doubles)
 Matthew Ebden – Newport (doubles)
 Ryan Harrison – Newport (doubles)
 Alex Bogomolov Jr. – Atlanta (doubles)
 Alexander Peya – Hamburg (doubles)
 Fabio Fognini – Umag (doubles)

Mixed doubles
 Scott Lipsky – French Open   (mixed doubles) 
 Jürgen Melzer – Wimbledon Championships  (mixed doubles) 
 Jack Sock – US Open  (mixed doubles) 

The following players defended a main circuit title in singles, doubles, or mixed doubles:
 Bob Bryan – Australian Open (doubles), Houston (doubles), Madrid (doubles)
 Mike Bryan – Australian Open (doubles), Houston (doubles), Madrid (doubles)
 Robin Söderling – Rotterdam (singles)
 Novak Djokovic – Dubai (singles)
 Robert Lindstedt – Casablanca (doubles), Båstad (doubles)
 Horia Tecău – Casablanca (doubles), Båstad (doubles)
 Rafael Nadal – Monte Carlo (singles), French Open (singles)
 Daniel Nestor – French Open (doubles), ATP World Tour Finals (doubles)
 Mardy Fish – Atlanta (singles)
 Andy Murray – Shanghai (singles)
 Roger Federer – Basel (singles), ATP World Tour Finals (singles)

Rankings
These are the ATP rankings, showing the race for the singles and doubles, and of the 2011 season, with number of rankings points, number of tournaments played, year-end ranking in 2010, highest and lowest position during the season (for singles and doubles individual only, as doubles team rankings are not calculated over a rolling year-to-date system), and number of spots gained or lost from the 2010 to the 2011 year-end rankings.

Singles

Number 1 ranking

Doubles

Prize money leaders

Statistics leaders

Best matches by ATPWorldTour.com

Best 5 Grand Slam / Davis Cup Matches

Best 5 ATP World Tour matches

Point distribution

Retirements and comebacks

Following is a list of notable players (winners of a main tour title, and/or part of the ATP rankings top 100 (singles) or top 50 (doubles) for at least one week) who announced their retirement from professional tennis, became inactive (after not playing for more than 52 weeks), or were permanently banned from playing, during the 2011 season:

 Yves Allegro (born 28 August 1978 in Grône, Switzerland) began his professional career in 1997, peaking at no. 32 in doubles in 2004. Allegro collected three doubles titles on the main tour. He played his last event in the main circuit at the 2011 Crédit Agricole Suisse Open Gstaad and in the challenger circuit at the 2011 Città di Como Challenger in August.
 Mario Ančić (born 30 March 1984 in Split, SFR Yugoslavia, now Croatia) joined the circuit in 2001, and peaked at no. 7 in singles in 2006 and no. 47 in doubles in 2004. A junior world no. 1, Ančić won three singles and five doubles titles on the main tour, scoring his best Grand Slam results with a quarterfinal at the French Open (2006) and a semifinal at Wimbledon (2004). He was also part of the Croatian team that won the Davis Cup trophy in 2005. Diminished by a recurring bout of mononucleosis and then back problems since 2007, Ančić eventually decided to retire from the sport to pursue a career as a lawyer. He played his last tournament in Munich in May 2010.
 Simon Aspelin (born 11 May 1974 in Saltsjöbaden, Sweden) turned professional in 1998, reaching his peak at doubles no. 7 in 2008. One-time runner-up at the Tennis Masters Cup (2007), Aspelin won 12 doubles titles, including one major at the US Open (2007, def. Dlouhý/Vízner) with Austrian Julian Knowle. Alongside fellow Swede Thomas Johansson Aspelin won the silver medal at the 2008 Beijing Olympics doubles event (lost to Federer/Wawrinka). He played his last tournament in Båstad in July.
 Marcos Daniel (born 4 July 1978 in Passo Fundo, Brazil) joined the circuit in 1997, reaching his career-high singles ranking of no. 56 in 2009. Daniel's success came mostly on the ATP Challenger Tour, where he collected 14 singles and eight doubles titles. He last competed on the main circuit in Estoril in April.
 Ashley Fisher (born 25 September 1975 in New South Wales, Australia) began his professional career in 1998, peaking at no. 19 in doubles in 2009. Fisher was a doubles semifinalist at the US Open (2006) – his best Grand Slam result, and collected four doubles titles on the main tour. He played his last event in Beijing in October.
 Gastón Gaudio (born 9 December 1978 in Temperley, Argentina) turned professional in 1996 and reached a career-high singles ranking of world no. 5 in 2005, making the year-end top 10 twice (2004–05). Over the course of his 15-year career, Gaudio collected three doubles and eight singles titles on the main circuit, among which one French Open title (2004, def. Coria, saving two match points in the final) – the only time the Argentinian went past the fourth round in a Grand Slam event. After four years spent out of the Top 100, Gaudio chose to retire from the sport. He played his last match at the Kitzbühel Challenger in August 2010.
 Óscar Hernández (born 10 April 1978 in Barcelona, Spain)'arrived on the main tour in 1998, peaking at the no. 48 spot in singles in 2007. Hernández, winner of one doubles titles on the main circuit, decided to retire after complications following a spinal disc herniation operation. He played his last match at the Naples Challenger in September 2010.
 Joachim Johansson (born 1 July 1982 in Lund, Sweden) turned professional in 2000, and reached a career high of no. 9 in singles in 2005. Winner of three singles and one doubles titles, the six-foot six's best Grand Slam performance came with a semifinal appearance at the US Open (2004). His career stuck by shoulder and elbow injuries, Johansson opted for retirement in early 2008 before deciding for a comeback later in the season. He played his last match at a Swiss ITF Men's Circuit event in March.
 Stefan Koubek (born 2 January 1977 in Klagenfurt, Austria) joined the main tour in 1994 and peaked at no. 20 in singles in 2000. The Austrian collected three singles and one doubles titles on the circuit, his best Grand Slam result coming with a quarterfinal showing at the Australian Open (2002). Koubek played his final tournament in Kitzbühel in August.
 Nicolás Lapentti (born 13 August 1976 in Guayaquil, Ecuador) turned professional in 1995, and reached his highest singles ranking, no. 6, in late 1999. Boys' doubles champion at the French Open and at the US Open in 1994, Lapentti went on to collect five singles and three doubles titles on the main circuit, his best Grand Slam results coming with a quarterfinal at Wimbledon (2002) and a semifinal at the Australian Open (1999). He played his last match at the French Open in May 2010.
 Harel Levy (born 5 August 1978 in Ramat HaSharon, Israel) became a tennis professional in 1995, reaching his career-best singles ranking of no. 30 in 2001. During his sixteen-year career, Levy played on both the main and the Challenger Tour, winning one ATP doubles title. He played his last match at the Granby Challenger in July.
 Wesley Moodie (born 14 February 1979 in Durban, South Africa) came on the main tour in 2000, reaching the no. 57 singles spot in 2005, and the no. 8 doubles spot in 2009. Winner of one singles and six doubles titles, including one Grand Slam title at Wimbledon with Stephen Huss (2005, def. B. Bryan/M. Bryan), Moodie also finished as runner-up in mixed doubles at Wimbledon (2010, partnering Lisa Raymond) and in doubles at the French Open (2009, with Dick Norman). He last played at Wimbledon in June.
 Thomas Muster  (born 2 October 1967 in Leibnitz, Austria) joined the tour in 1985 and unofficially retired in 1999, eventually returning to competition in 2010. In his first 14-year stint on the circuit, Muster was ranked world no. 1 and collected 44 singles titles (including one French Open (1995, def. Chang)). During his comeback, the Austrian compiled win–loss records of 0–3 on the main tour and 2–20 at the Challenger level, reaching his new best ranking, no. 847 (singles), in September 2011. Muster officially played his last main tour event in Vienna in October, but has not ruled out remaining active for the 2012 ATP Challenger Tour season.
 Vincent Spadea (born 18 July 1974 in Chicago, United States) became a tennis professional in 1993, peaking at no. 18 in singles in 2005. The American collected one singles and three doubles titles on the main circuit, his best Grand Slam result coming with a semifinal run at the Australian Open (1999). Spadea became inactive after not playing for more than 52 weeks, competing for the last time in the Newport qualifying draw in July 2010.
 Kristof Vliegen (born 22 June 1982 in Maaseik, Belgium) became a tennis pro in 2001, reaching career-high rankings of singles no. 30 in 2006, and doubles no. 40 in 2007. Junior doubles champion at Wimbledon (2000), Vliegen's success came mostly on the ATP Challenger Tour. He played for the last time in the Cherbourg Challenger qualifying in February.

Following is a list of notable players (winners of a main tour title, and/or part of the ATP rankings top 100 (singles) or top 50 (doubles) for at least one week) who came out of retirement from professional tennis during the 2011 season:

 Goran Ivanišević (born 13 September 1971 in Split, SFR Yugoslavia, now Croatia) turned professional in 1988, and reached his highest singles ranking, no. 2, in July 1994. Ivanišević went on to collect 22 singles and nine doubles titles on the main circuit, his best Grand Slam results being four Wimbledon finals (three losses, one win (2001, def. Rafter)). The Croat retired in 2004 but made a one-off return on the ATP World Tour to play doubles with Marin Čilić in Zagreb in January – the pair eventually lost in straight sets in the first round.
 Jacco Eltingh (born 29 August 1970 in Heerde, Netherlands) and Paul Haarhuis (born 19 February 1966 in Eindhoven, Netherlands) first played on the main circuit from 1988 to 1999 (Eltingh) and from 1989 to 2003 (Haarhuis). Both men occupied the doubles world no. 1 position, Eltingh for a total of 63 weeks between 1995 and 1999, Haarhuis for 71 weeks between 1994 and 1999, the two finishing respectively four (1994–1995, 1997–1998) and eight (1993–2000) seasons in the doubles Top Ten. Together, the pair collected 36 tour titles, including one year-end championships title (1998), and completed a career Grand Slam (Australian Open (1994), French Open (1995, 1998), Wimbledon (1998), US Open (1994)). Eltingh and Haarhuis decided for a one-off return to the circuit at the February Rotterdam 500 event – the pair lost in straight sets in the first round.

See also
2011 WTA Tour
2011 ATP Challenger Tour
2011 ITF Women's Circuit
2011 ITF Futures tournaments
Association of Tennis Professionals
International Tennis Federation

Notes

 Group A runner-up Belgium (eventual runner-up) replaced Group A winner Serbia for the title match after Serbian player Ana Ivanovic withdrew from the event before the final with an abdomen injury.
 Lukáš Dlouhý and Paul Hanley won the final after Robert Lindstedt and Horia Tecău were forced to retire because of a left calf injury contracted by Lindstedt.
 Michaël Llodra and Nenad Zimonjić (eventual runners-up) advanced to the final after Philipp Kohlschreiber and Tomáš Berdych were forced to withdraw because of a flu contracted by Berdych.
 Milos Raonic (eventual champion) advanced to the final after Gaël Monfils withdrew from the event because of a left wrist injury.
 Tomáš Berdych withdrew from the tournament after he was unable to serve in the third set against Djokovic due to a left quadriceps injury. Djokovic's advancement eventually led to his third consecutive title in Dubai.
Tommy Robredo retired ahead of his quarterfinal match with a strained left adductor muscle, which he suffered during his match against Sam Querrey in the fourth round. His withdrawal allowed Juan Martín del Potro to advance to a masters semifinal after a 17-month hiatus since being a runner-up for the 2009 Rogers Masters
Gilles Simon retired after 3–0 loss in the first set suffering from a stiff neck. Roger Federer advanced to semis for the fifth time in Miami.
Janko Tipsarević withdrew prior to the semifinal match due to right thigh injury. Due to this walkover scheduled opponent Novak Djokovic claimed his second Serbia Open title.
Milos Raonic suffered a back injury and subsequently gave up the match with Fernando Verdasco at the very beginning of the second set while he was one set down, 4–6. Verdasco advanced in the final.
The American runners up Mardy Fish and Andy Roddick was forced to step back before the start of the match due to the right shoulder injury of Roddick. Last year finalists Sam Querrey and John Isner won their first Masters title and second overall.
Robin Haase gave up the match while being down at second set to 2–0 against Victor Hănescu. He twisted his ankle and as a result he retired from his second quarterfinal of the year (ATP tour level). In the Dutchman's eighth career quarterfinal, he failed for the seventh time to advance. Hănescu has already won one title and will face his second semifinal of the year.
Fabio Fognini withdrew after his 5-set match victory over Albert Montañés, which caused him a left leg injury. Ahead of his first French open/Grand Slam quarterfinal against Novak Djokovic he was forced to withdraw resulting in Djokovic keeping his unbeatable record and reaching the semifinals.
Andreas Seppi won the final after Janko Tipsarević was forced to retire late in the match due to a right hip injury.
The final was originally scheduled to take place on 17 June but due to rain delays it was eventually played on 19 June and moved to Roehampton.

References
General

Specific

External links
Association of Tennis Professionals (ATP) World Tour official website
International Tennis Federation (ITF) official website

 
ATP World Tour
ATP Tour seasons